Samuel Russell (1789–1862) was an American entrepreneur and trader.

Samuel Russell may also refer to:
 Samuel Lyon Russell (1816–1891), American congressman
 Samuel Russell (Yale co-founder) (1660–1731), co-founder of Yale University
 Samuel Russell (politician) (1848–1924), Presbyterian missionary, newspaper editor and politician in Canada
 Samuel Bridgman Russell, Scottish architect
 Samuel Thomas Russell (1766–1845), English actor

See also
Sam Russell (disambiguation)